Trịnh Thị Bé (born 3 September 1955) is a Vietnamese middle-distance runner. She competed in the women's 1500 metres at the 1980 Summer Olympics.

References

External links
 

1955 births
Living people
Athletes (track and field) at the 1980 Summer Olympics
Vietnamese female middle-distance runners
Olympic athletes of Vietnam
Place of birth missing (living people)
21st-century Vietnamese women